The 2016–17 Greek Football Cup was the 75th edition of the Greek Football Cup. Just as last year's edition, a total of 34 clubs were accepted to enter. The competition commenced on 14 September 2016 with the Preliminary Round and concluded on 6 May 2017 with the Final. The winner of the competition was PAOK for fifth time.

Teams

Calendar

Participating clubs

Preliminary round
The draw for this round took place on 24 August 2016.

Summary

|}

Matches

Sparta won 5–1 on aggregate.

OFI won 2–0 on aggregate.

Group stage
The draw for this round took place on 29 September 2016.

Group A

Group B

Group C

Group D

Group E

Group F

Group G

Group H

Knockout phase
Each tie in the knockout phase, apart from the final, was played over two legs, with each team playing one leg at home. The team that scored more goals on aggregate over the two legs advanced to the next round. If the aggregate score was level, the away goals rule was applied, i.e. the team that scored more goals away from home over the two legs advanced. If away goals were also equal, then extra time was played. The away goals rule was again applied after extra time, i.e. if there were goals scored during extra time and the aggregate score was still level, the visiting team advanced by virtue of more away goals scored. If no goals were scored during extra time, the winners were decided by a penalty shoot-out. In the final, which were played as a single match, if the score was level at the end of normal time, extra time was played, followed by a penalty shoot-out if the score was still level.The mechanism of the draws for each round is as follows:
In the draw for the round of 16, the eight group winners are seeded, and the eight group runners-up are unseeded.The seeded teams are drawn against the unseeded teams, with the seeded teams hosting the second leg.
In the draws for the quarter-finals onwards, there are no seedings, and teams from the same group can be drawn against each other.

Bracket

Round of 16
The draw for this round took place on 20 December 2016.

Seeding

Summary

|}

Matches

Xanthi won on away goals.

Platanias won 3–1 on aggregate.

AEK Athens won 7–0 on aggregate.

Olympiacos won 3–1 on aggregate.

PAOK won 6–1 on aggregate.

Asteras Tripolis won 3–0 on aggregate.

Atromitos won 4–2 on aggregate.

Panathinaikos won 7–0 on aggregate.

Quarter-finals
The draw for this round took place on 27 January 2017.

Summary

|}

Matches

AEK Athens won 3–0 on aggregate.

PAOK won on away goals.

Olympiacos won 2–1 on aggregate.

Panathinaikos won 5–0 on aggregate.

Semi-finals
The draw for this round took place on 21 March 2017.

Summary

|}

Matches

PAOK won 4–2 on aggregate.

AEK Athens won on away goals.

Final

References

External links
2016–17 Greek Football Cup at the Greek Football Federation site (Greek)

Greek Football Cup seasons
Cup
Greece